This is a list of the squads with their players that competed at the 2015–16 LEN Champions League.

CNA Barceloneta

AN Brescia

VK Budva

ASC Duisburg

ZF Eger

Galatasaray

Waspo Hannover

Jadran Carine

Jug Dubrovnik

Lokomotiv Tbilisi

CN Marseille

HAVK Mladost

Montpellier

Olympiacos

Digi Oradea

OSC Budapest

Partizan

VK Primorje

VK Radnički

Pro Recco

CN Sabadell

Spandau 04

Spartak

Szolnoki VSK

Valletta

Sm Verona

NC Vouliagmeni

References

2015–16 LEN Champions League
LEN Champions League squads